Aryabhatta College is a NAAC accredited A+ college  fully maintained by University of Delhi and named after the ancient Indian mathematician Aryabhatta. As mentioned, It is an institution directly maintained by the University of Delhi. The college is located in South Delhi at Benito Juarez Marg, Delhi, South Campus. It awards degrees under the University of Delhi and offers 15 courses at the undergraduate level in humanities, commerce and science streams. There are around 2200 students on the rolls of the college.

History 
Aryabhatta College, formerly known as Ram Lal Anand College(Evening) became a full-fledged morning college from the academic session 2014–15. Ram Lal Anand College (Evening) was established in 1973 when the University of Delhi took over the college from the Trust that managed the RamLal Anand college. The Trust was set up in 1964 by a philanthropist and legal luminary Late Sh. Ram Lal Anand, a senior advocate in the Supreme Court of India, to impart education at the university level.

Campus 

The college has a lush green campus. It is adjacent to the South Campus of the University of Delhi in the surroundings of the South Delhi section of the Aravali range. The college consists of classrooms, auditorium and a seminar room. The college maintains a playground for sports. Various games like volleyball, cricket, football, which are organised under the supervision of the Director of Physical Education. The college has a well-equipped computer lab, NCC and NSS rooms, computer room, Girls common room and photocopier. The college also has a newly constructed double-storied canteen.

Organisation and administration

Departments 
 Department of Business Economics
 Department of Commerce
 Department of Computer Science
 Department of Economics
 Department of  English
 Department of Hindi
 Department of History
 Department of Mathematics
 Department of Political Science
 Department of Psychology
 Department of Management

Academics

Undergraduate Programmes 
The college offers following courses:
 B.A(H) Business Economics
 B.Com
 B.Com(H)
 B.A(H) Economics
 B.A(H) English
 B.A(H) Political Science
 B.A(H) Hindi
 B.A. Programme (Political Science)
 B.A. Programme (History)
 Bachelor in Management Studies(BMS)
 B.A (H) Psychology
 B.A (H) History
 B.Sc (H) Mathematics
 B.Sc (H) Computer Science

Library 
The college has a library. The library is open to bonafide students of all classes. All important textbooks are kept in the reserve section to enable students to write their tutorials. It has more than one lakh books and 2000+ eJournals. There is a reading room, which subscribes to many dailies, weeklies, periodicals and journals on a variety of subjects. The college library also provides a facility of Book Bank to the economically weaker members of the college.

Student life

Hostel 
At present, the college does not provide hostel accommodation to its students. However, many private accommodations are available in the vicinity of the college.

Student Societies 
Every department has its own society which is tasked with organising the department-specific co-curricular activities.

A number of student societies function in the college. There are 21 societies and cells active in the college. The purpose of these societies is to provide opportunities to students for self-expression and training. They also help in all-around development lege also hosts and conducts seminars, debates, cultural programmes etc. to encourage creative activities among the students.

Departmental  Societies 
Arahata: The B.A. Programme Society 
 Business Economics Society
 Srijan, The Psychology Society
 Commerce Society
 English Society
 Hindi Society
 History Society
 Parisā, Political Science Society
 Economics Society
 TechPioneers, Computer Science Society
 Mathematics Society
 Sankalp, the BMS society

Extra-Curricular societies 
 ZeroHour - The Debating Society
 Nibs and Brushes - The Art Society 
 Rangmanch - The Theatre Society
 Arts and Cultural Society
 Adventure Society
 Photography Society
 Dance Society
 Music Society

Other Societies 

 Prashnottare, The Quiz Club
 Swavalamban, The Startup Club
 CDF Aryabhatta
 Enactus Aryabhatta
 Eartha Aryabhatta Chapter
 Finance and Investment Cell
 The Placement and Internship cell
 The Marketing Cell
 E-Cell: The Entrepreneurship Cell
 Environment Study Circle
 Gandhi Study Circle
 Film Appreciation Club
 NSS

See also
Education in India
Education in Delhi
University of Delhi
List of institutions of higher education in Delhi

References 

 2. DU official website
 http://www.du.ac.in/du/

External links 

Universities and colleges in Delhi
Delhi University
1973 establishments in Delhi
Educational institutions established in 1973